East Peoria Community High School is a four-year public high school located in East Peoria, Illinois, and is the only school of East Peoria Community High School District 309.  As of 2018, the school has 983 students enrolled. East Peoria Community High School has several feeder schools: Central Junior High School (East Peoria School District 86), Parkview Middle School (Creve Coeur School District 76), and Robein Elementary School (Robein School District 85).

Additions

During the summer of 2009 construction began on "E" building. The new construction includes a new larger cafeteria and multiple classrooms.
The cafeteria seats 800 students and has a separate room for faculty dining. The classrooms are state of the art, with built-in sound systems, DVD and VHS, and up-to-date electronics.
"E" building is the first phase of construction. For phase II the old lunch room is being turned into a fine arts wing, and phase III is the demolition of the original building "A building".

Notable alumni

Tim Broe (1995 graduate) — runner: 2004 U.S. Olympic Team (Athens, men's 5000 meter, 11th place); graduated from Central Junior High first; also coached at EPCHS from 2007 to 2010
Corwin Clatt - football player for Notre Dame and NFL's Chicago Cardinals
William Lane Craig (1967 graduate) — philosopher and Christian apologist
Ray Giacoletti (1980 graduate) — basketball head coach, University of Utah, Eastern Washington, North Dakota State and Drake
Matthew F. Hale (1989 graduate) — white supremacist, Creativity Movement
Kent Hovind (1971 graduate) — Young Earth creationist
Sam Kinison (1971 graduate) — stand-up comedian
Howard Lance (1973 graduate) — Chairman & CEO, Harris Corporation
Cristy Lane (1958 graduate) — country/gospel singer
Roger Phegley (1974 graduate) — basketball player for Bradley and several NBA teams
Gary Richrath (1968 graduate) — musician, guitar player for REO Speedwagon
Tim Simpson (1987 graduate) — football player, Illinois Fighting Illini, Peoria Pirates, several NFL teams including Pittsburgh Steelers

References

External links 
East Peoria Community High School – official website

Public high schools in Illinois
East Peoria, Illinois
Schools in Tazewell County, Illinois
1900 establishments in Illinois